Chief Theophilus Adebayo Doherty  (24 February 1895 – 18 November 1974) was a Nigerian businessman and politician.

Biography

He was born the second son of J.H. Doherty of Lagos, an Amaro merchant. Doherty studied for a Commercial Certificate at the London School of Economics and Political Science from 1916-1919 and was admitted to the Middle Temple on 13 June 1918. He was Called to the Bar on 20 April 1921.

A member of the Nigerian National Democratic Party, Doherty was elected to the Legislative Council representing Lagos in 1928, and was re-elected in 1933. He did not contest the 1938 elections.

In 1933, he founded the National Bank of Nigeria alongside Dr. Akinola Maja, Olatunde Johnson and a few other businessmen. He also became a prominent member of the Nigerian Association of African Importers and Exporters, an association designed to link African traders who depend on foreign firms for goods with overseas trading houses and also act as an African Chamber of Commerce. In the 1940s, the association was a leading indigenous elite business group that negotiated trading concessions with the colonial government.

References

1895 births
Year of death missing
Nigerian National Democratic Party politicians
Members of the House of Representatives (Nigeria)
Yoruba businesspeople
Yoruba politicians
20th-century Nigerian businesspeople
20th-century Nigerian politicians
Lagos State politicians
19th-century Nigerian people
Members of the Legislative Council of Nigeria